Thoughts of Dar es Salaam is an album by the American jazz pianist/composer Horace Tapscott, recorded in 1996 and released on the Arabesque label.

Reception

The AllMusic review by Thom Jurek stated: "The final album by West Coast pianist and composer Horace Tapscott is one of sublime gentility, reaching harmonic elegance and meditative grace".

Track listing
All compositions by Horace Tapscott except as indicated
 "As a Child" - 7:06
 "Bibi Mkuu: The Great Black Lady" (Alan Hines) - 5:34
 "Lullaby in Black" (Thurman Green) - 3:19
 "Sandy and Niles" - 4:44
 "Wiletta's Walk" - 9:08
 "Social Call" (Gigi Gryce) - 8:53
 "Oleo" (Sonny Rollins) - 8:07
 "Thoughts of Dar Es Salaam" - 6:50
 "Now's the Time" (Charlie Parker) - 5:59

Personnel
Horace Tapscott - piano
Ray Drummond - bass
Billy Hart - drums

References

Arabesque Records albums
Horace Tapscott albums
1997 albums